Chelis gracilis is a moth in the family Erebidae. It was described by Vladimir Viktorovitch Dubatolov in 1996. It is found in the Chatkal Mountains and Kyrgyzstan.

This species was moved from the genus Palearctia to Chelis as a result of phylogenetic research published in 2016.

Subspecies
 Chelis gracilis gracilis
 Chelis gracilis arcana (Plustsch & Dolin, 2000) (Kyrgyzstan)

References

Moths described in 1996
Arctiina